The British Windward Islands was an administrative grouping of British colonies in the Windward Islands of the West Indies, existing from 1833 until 31 December 1959 and consisting of the islands of Grenada, St Lucia, Saint Vincent, the Grenadines, Barbados (the seat of the governor until 1885, when it returned to its former status of a completely separate colony), Tobago (until 1889, when it was joined to Trinidad), and (from 1940) Dominica, previously included in the British Leeward Islands.

Administrative history
The seat of government was Bridgetown on Barbados, from 1871 to 1885, and thereafter St. George's on Grenada. The islands were not a single colony, but a confederation of separate colonies with a common governor-in-chief, while each island retained its own institutions. The Windward Islands had neither legislature, laws, revenue nor tariff in common.  However, there was a common audit system, while the islands united in maintaining certain institutions of general utility.

Judicial history
In 1859 a common court of appeal for the group was established, composed of the chief justices of the respective island colonies.  Under the West Indian Court of Appeal Act 1919 this court was replaced by the West Indian Court of Appeal, responsible for appeals from not only the Windward Islands but also the Federal Colony of the Leeward Islands, Barbados, Trinidad and Tobago, and British Guiana.

In 1939 the Windward and Leeward Islands Supreme Court and the Windward and Leeward Islands Court of Appeal were established, which was replaced in 1967 by the Eastern Caribbean Supreme Court which provides both functions.

Chief Justices of the Windward and Leeward Islands
 1940–1942 James Henry Jarrett
 1943–1950 Sir Clement Malone 
 1950–1957 Sir Donald Jackson
 1958–1963 Sir Cyril George Xavier Henriques
 1963–?1967 Frank E. Field

See also
List of Governors of the British Windward Islands
History of the British West Indies
Windward Islands
British Leeward Islands
Windward Islands cricket team

References

Sources

External links
Queen and Commonwealth: Other Caribbean realms for the official website of the British monarchy
U.S Library of Congress – Barbados and the Windward Islands colony
WorldStatesmen.org

 
.Windward Islands
Windward Islands
Windward Islands
Former countries in the Caribbean
Former colonies in North America
Former federations
History of British Grenada
History of the Colony of Barbados
History of British Dominica
History of British Saint Lucia
History of British Saint Vincent and the Grenadines
History of Trinidad and Tobago
States and territories established in 1833
States and territories disestablished in 1958
1830s establishments in the Caribbean
1833 establishments in the British Empire
1960 disestablishments in the British Empire
1833 establishments in North America
1960 disestablishments in North America